Up In Town is a six-part series of short (10-minute) monologues, featuring Joanna Lumley as the middle-aged, divorced and lonely Madison Blakelock. The series was produced for television by Baby Cow Productions, and screened on BBC Two. It has subsequently been released on DVD.

Summary
Madison Blakelock is delighted to be living her 'new life', since her executive class husband, who works 'up in town', and she parted company 18 years before. And now she has nothing more to do but sit before her mirror, picking over the bones of her past with an optimism and energy dizzyingly at odds with her reality. As the unrecognised failures of her life mount up, the loss of love, friends, money, purpose and her beloved cat, the cracks in her terrifyingly maintained facade begin to show.

Critical reception
The series received a positive reception from critics. The Times praised Lumley and her "rich, darkly comic and beautifully observed performance".The Guardian cited that the series deserved better scheduling.

The series has also been compared to Alan Bennett's Talking Heads series of monologues.

References

External links
 

BBC Television shows
2002 British television series debuts
2002 British television series endings